Mirosław Korbel (born 31 January 1963) is a former motorcycle speedway rider from Poland. Since retiring he has been a team coach for Kolejarz Opole.

Career 
Korbel won the gold medal in the prestigious Golden Helmet during the 1990 Polish speedway season. During the same season he won the silver medal at the Polish Individual Speedway Championship behind Zenon Kasprzak.

He spent the majority of his career riding for Rybnik, where he won three medals at the Polish league championships (two silver and one bronze). 

He competed in the 1988 Individual Speedway World Championship qualifying, winning the first Continental round and reaching the Continental Speedway Final.

References 

1963 births
Polish speedway riders
Year of birth missing (living people)
People from Rydułtowy